Union Sportive de la Gendarmerie Nationale is a Nigerien football club based in Niamey. It was founded in 1996, and competes in the Niger Premier League. In 2021, it won both the league and the cup, the first titles in the club's history.

Stadium
The team plays its home matches at the 35,000 capacity Stade Général Seyni Kountché.

Achievements
Super Ligue: 1
2020–21

Niger Cup: 1
2021

Niger Super Cup: 0

CAF competitions record
Last update: 24 February 2023

Notes

 PR: Preliminary round
 1R: First round
 2Q: Second qualifying round
 PO: Play-off round
 GS: Group stage

References

Football clubs in Niger
Super Ligue (Niger) clubs
Sport in Niamey